Heizhuanghu Area is an area and township on the southeastern corner Chaoyang District, Beijing, China. It borders Guanzhuang Township and Beiyuan Subdistrict to the north, Liyuan Town to the east, Taihu Town to the south, Dougezhuang Township to the west. According to the 2020 census, the population of Heizhuanghu township was 49,983.

The name of Heizhuanghu originates from the end of Ming dynasty, when the originally settlers of this region lived in half-underground shacks.

History

Administrative Divisions 
As of 2021, Heizhuanghu has 23 subdivision under it, with 7 communities and 16 villages:

See also 
 List of township-level divisions of Beijing

References

Chaoyang District, Beijing
Areas of Beijing